Ola Svensson (born 11 July 1967) is a retired Swedish football defender.

References

1967 births
Living people
Swedish footballers
Degerfors IF players
Moss FK players
Aalesunds FK players
IFK Eskilstuna players
Association football defenders
Swedish expatriate footballers
Expatriate footballers in Norway
Swedish expatriate sportspeople in Norway
Allsvenskan players
Norwegian First Division players